Archibald Rowan may refer to:

Archie Rowan (1855–1923), Scottish footballer
Archibald Hamilton Rowan (1751–1834), founder of the Society of United Irishmen